The Ride is an album by American hard rock power trio Small Town Titans, released in November 2020.  The album features nine original songs, as well as a cover of Marcy Playground's "Sex and Candy".

Reception
Mike O'Cull of Rock and Blues Muse regards the album as "one of the best rock releases of our current era and shows us all just how much life is left in the primordial power trio format."  Gerrod Harris of Spill Magazine praised the album highly, saying that with the album the band "have set the tone for the shape of hard rock throughout the coming decade."

Track listing

Personnel
 Phillip Freeman – vocals, bass guitar
 Benjamin Guiles – guitar, backing vocals
 Jonathan O'Neil – drums, backing vocals

Production
 Production: Grant McFarland and Carson Slovak (1–8, 10), Kevin Soffera, Mike Plotnikoff, Howard Benson, Ted Jensen (9)

References

2020 albums
Hard rock albums by American artists